Ellen M. Canavan is an American Republican politician from Needham, Massachusetts. She represented the 13th Norfolk district in the Massachusetts House of Representatives from 1981 to 1988.

See also
 1981-1982 Massachusetts legislature
 1983-1984 Massachusetts legislature
 1985-1986 Massachusetts legislature
 1987-1988 Massachusetts legislature

References

Year of birth missing
Year of death missing
Members of the Massachusetts House of Representatives
Women state legislators in Massachusetts
20th-century American women politicians
20th-century American politicians
People from Needham, Massachusetts